"Sometimes a Lady" is a song co-written and recorded by American country music artist Eddy Raven.  It was released in May 1986 as the first single from the album Right Hand Man.  The song reached #3 on the Billboard Hot Country Singles & Tracks chart.  It was written by Raven and Frank J. Myers.

Chart performance

References

1986 singles
1986 songs
Eddy Raven songs
Songs written by Frank J. Myers
Songs written by Eddy Raven
Song recordings produced by Paul Worley
RCA Records singles